Bugisi is a Catholic parish near Didia in northern Tanzania. It is a "twin parish" of Queen of Peace parish in Bray, County Wicklow, Ireland.

References

Populated places in Shinyanga Region